Aatto Albanus Sonninen (24 December 1922 – 31 March 2009) was a phoniatrician and was an influential person in Phoniatrics and Logopedics for half a century.

Sonninen graduated from Kuopio Lyceum in 1942 and graduated as a Licentiate in Medicine in 1950. In Medicine and Surgery he received his doctorate in 1956, where he was also a specialist in speech and sound disorders and ear, nose and throat qualifications. In the early years of his career, Sonninen worked for several hospitals and made field trips to the United States and to numerous countries in Europe. Professor's Honorary Title Sonninen was awarded in 1981. He retired in 1986.

Awards and honors 
 1978 International Gold Award 
 1980 Hermann Gutzmann medal 
 1982 the degree of Professor honoris causa 
 1997 Voice Foundation The Quintana Research Award 
 The Quintana Research Award  is an engineering award, recognizing those who design or utilize technology and apply engineering principles that provide further understanding of the voice.
 1997 G. Paul Moore Lecturer 
 2002 Doctor honoris causa by the University of Oulu, Finland

Thesis publications 
 Sonninen, Aatto:  102 pages. Acta oto-laryngologica. University of Helsinki, Finland, 1956. ISSN 0365-5237.

Computer Voice Fields of Connected Speech 
 
 Sonninen, Aatto & Hurme, Pertti & Toivonen, Raimo: Computer Voice Fields in the Study of Normal Phonation. Acta phoniatrica Latina 10, pp. 345–356. 1988.
 Sonninen, Aatto & Hurme, Pertti & Pruszewicz, Antoni & Toivonen, Raimo:  In: Liber Amicorum: professori Dr. P. H. Damsté. On the Occasion of his Retirement by his Friends and Colleagues (L. van Gelder. C. Waar, H. van Wijngaarden, eds. ), Utcecht pp. 45–48. 1987.
 Sonninen, Aatto & Vilkman, Erkki & Hurme, Pertti & Toivonen, Raimo:  In Scandinavian Journal of Logopedics and Phoniatrics 12, pp. 20–28. 1987.
 Jaroma, Marjatta & Sonninen, Aatto & Hurme, Pertti & Toivonen, Raimo: Computer Voice Field Observations of Menopausal Dysphonia. Paper presented at the 13th Congress of the European Union of Phoniatricians, pp. 34–35. Vienna 1986. 5–9 November 1986.
 Sonninen, Aatto & Hurme, Pertti & Vilkman, Erkki: Observations of voice production by means of Computer Voice Fields. Folia Phoniatrica 1986;38:366.
 Vilkman, Erkki & Sonninen, Aatto & Hurme, Pertti: Observations on Voice Production by Means of Computer Voice Fields. In: Logopedics and Phoniatrics. Issues for Future Research. Proceedings of the XXth Congress of the International Association Logopedics and Phoniatrics, pp. 370–371. Tokyo 1986. 3–7 August 1986.
 Sonninen, Aatto & Hurme, Pertti & Toivonen, Raimo & Vilkman, Erkki: Computer Voice Fields of Connected Speech, Symposium on Voice Disorders, Sweden, 23 August 1985.
 Sonninen, Aatto & Hurme, Pertti & Toivonen, Raimo & Vilkman, Erkki: Computer Voice Fields of Connected Speech, Papers in Speech Research, University of Jyväskylä, Finland 6, pp. 93–111. 1985.

Other publications 
 Sonninen, Aatto:  (From the registers of human voice). Laulupedagogi 1989–1990. Laulupedagogit ry:n vuosijulkaisu. Helsinki: Yliopistopaino, Finland. pp. 4–21. 1990. ISSN 0784-5936.
 Hurme, Pertti (toim.):  Studies Presented to Aatto Sonninen on the Occasion of His Sixtieth Birthday, 24 December 1982, Papers in Speech Research, 5, University of Jyväskylä, Finland. .

References

External links 
 
 
 
 
 

People from Siilinjärvi
1922 births
2009 deaths
Finnish physicians
Academic staff of the University of Jyväskylä
Speech and language pathologists